The Prize of Moscow News, also known as the Moscow Skate, Nouvelles de Moscou, and the Moscow News Trophy, was an international, senior-level figure skating competition held in the Soviet Union from 1966 to 1990 (excluding 1989). It was held annually in Moscow in December and effectively was the predecessor to the Cup of Russia ISU Grand Prix of Figure Skating event. The winners received a "Crystal Skate" statuette.

Medalists

Men

Ladies

Pairs

Ice dancing

References

Men's results
More results

 
Figure skating in the Soviet Union
Figure skating competitions